Perley Dunn Aldrich (November 6, 1863 - November 20, 1933) was a vocal teacher, composer and conductor.

Biography
He was born on November 6, 1863, in Blackstone, Massachusetts. He married Jennie L. Lamson in 1887. He died on November 20, 1933, at age 70. He was buried in Elmwood Cemetery in Adams, New York.

References

External links
Perley Dunn Aldrich at WorldCat

1863 births
1933 deaths
American composers
Musicians from Philadelphia